The Phantom Creek Formation is a geologic formation of the Maude Group in British Columbia. It preserves fossils dating back to the Early Jurassic period.

See also 
 List of fossiliferous stratigraphic units in British Columbia

References

Further reading 
 E.S. Carter, B.E.B. Cameron, and P.L. Smith. 1988. Lower and Middle Jurassic radiolarian biostratigraphy and systematic paleontology, Queen Charlotte Islands, British Columbia. Geological Survey of Canada, Bulletin 386:1-109

Geologic formations of Canada
Jurassic British Columbia
Toarcian Stage
Sandstone formations of Canada
Shallow marine deposits
Paleontology in British Columbia